Hobbs is an unincorporated community in Caroline County, Maryland, United States.

The American Discovery Trail runs through the village.

References

Unincorporated communities in Caroline County, Maryland
Unincorporated communities in Maryland